Daniel Light (10 July 1948 – 18 October 2014) was a professional footballer who played as a forward.

Career
Light began his career at Crystal Palace in 1965, making 22 appearances before being sold to Colchester United in 1968 for £4,000. He was a regular player for Colchester, and made 73 appearances before moving to Guildford City on a free transfer in 1970. He later played for Dartford, Dover, Wealdstone and Tonbridge Angels. Whilst at Dartford, he was part of the squad that finished as runners-up in the 1973–74 FA Trophy.

Later life and death
He retired and moved to Turners Hill. He died on 18 October 2014, aged 66.

References

External links

Danny Light at holmesdale.net

1948 births
2014 deaths
Footballers from Chiswick
English footballers
Association football forwards
Crystal Palace F.C. players
Colchester United F.C. players
Guildford City F.C. players
Dartford F.C. players
Dover F.C. players
Wealdstone F.C. players
Tonbridge Angels F.C. players
English Football League players
People from Turners Hill